It's Psychedelic Baby! Magazine is a Slovenian online music magazine dedicated to psychedelic and progressive music news, band interviews and album reviews. It was founded by Klemen Breznikar in October 2010, and was originally based in Ljubljana; it is currently headquartered in Prebold. The webzine has covered an extensive range of music over the years, from electronic to heavy metal, but generally focuses on psychedelic rock, psychedelic folk, progressive rock, progressive metal, krautrock, art rock, garage rock and space rock.

Three physical issues of It's Psychedelic Baby! Magazine have been published, one yearly between 2014 and 2016, and the webzine also produces a monthly podcast series titled It's Psychedelic Baby! Podcast since 2015. The website is notable for its extensive retrospective interviews with musicians and bands from the 1960s and 1970s, its articles having been quoted or re-published in such publications as The New York Times, Financial Times, The Wall Street Journal, Rolling Stone, The Guardian, MSN, Intelligencer Journal-Lancaster New Era, Houston Press, Chicago Reader, The Wire, Mint Lounge, Louder, BrooklynVegan, The List, BroadwayWorld, WhatCulture, Our Culture Mag, Ultimate Classic Rock, and Dangerous Minds.

Background

History 
Prior to founding It's Psychedelic Baby! Magazine, Klemen Breznikar operated the webzine Hippy Music, where he wrote reviews and shared classic releases from the 1960s' and 1970s' psychedelic music scene. Hippy Music launched in June 2007 and was modestly operated through Blogger, with Breznikar writing under the pseudonym Iban. It ultimately closed down after a year and a half, in late 2008, due to Breznikar's busy school schedule. Breznikar was then studying at the University of Ljubljana, Faculty of Arts where he earned a Bachelor's degree in Library and Information Science and a Master's degree in Book Studies.

In September 2010, Breznikar decided to take a year off from school and start a new online magazine. Originally launched under the lengthier name It's Psychedelic Baby, That's What It's All About, the webzine's first post was published on October 3, 2010. In the summer of 2011, the website adopted its abbreviated name, It's Psychedelic Baby! Magazine. The blog was originally hosted through Blogger, though it eventually moved to its own .com domain name on July 7, 2016.

Printed issues 
Starting in 2014, It's Psychedelic Baby! Magazine began publishing a yearly printed magazine featuring exclusive content. The first issue (Issue #1) was published on August 25, 2014 through a collaboration with German record label Merlin's Nose Records. It was bundled with a bonus Various Artists compilation compact disc featuring sixteen bands. It's Psychedelic Baby! Magazine quickly follow-up with its second music outing, acting as a record label for the release of Matthias von Stumberger's mini album Spielt Rockundroll Musik. The release came out on September 8, 2014 on a limited edition orange cassette tape and was co-released with British record label Evil Hoodoo Records.

In December 2015, It's Psychedelic Baby! Magazine published its second printed issue (Issue #2 1/2) through a collaboration with Spanish record label Guerssen Records. It was followed a year later, in December 2016, by its third printed issue (Issue #2 2/2), also jointly released by Guerssen Records. All of the graphics for the three issues of the printed magazine were created by American illustrator Justin Jackley, who had previously provided an original design for the website's header.

It's Psychedelic Baby! Podcast 
On June 7, 2015, the webzine introduced a podcast series titled It's Psychedelic Baby! Podcast. It however only lasted three shows, one per month, until August 18, 2015. On April 3, 2016, Scottish disk jockey Ross Beattie, professionally known as The Night Tripper, re-introduced the monthly podcast series. Starting with podcast #34, on March 13, 2019, a new visual identification was introduced, illustrated by Justin Jackley.

References

External links 

 

2010 establishments in Slovenia
Art rock
Companies of Slovenia
Garage rock
Internet properties established in 2010
Krautrock
Heavy metal music
Heavy metal publications
Magazines established in 2010
Magazines published in Slovenia
Music blogs
Music magazines
Music review websites
Online music magazines
Progressive rock
Psychedelic rock
Slovenian entertainment websites
Slovenian music websites
Space rock